A blue plaque is a permanent sign installed in a public place in the United Kingdom and elsewhere to commemorate a link between that location and a famous person, event, or former building on the site, serving as a historical marker. The term is used in the United Kingdom in two different senses. It may be used narrowly and specifically to refer to the "official" scheme administered by English Heritage, and currently restricted to sites within Greater London; or it may be used less formally to encompass a number of similar schemes administered by organisations throughout the UK.  The plaques erected are made in a variety of designs, shapes, materials and colours: some are blue, others are not. However, the term "blue plaque" is often used informally to encompass all such schemes.

The "official" scheme traces its origins to that launched in 1866 in London, on the initiative of the politician William Ewart, to mark the homes and workplaces of famous people. It has been administered successively by the Society of Arts (1866–1901), the London County Council (1901–1965), the Greater London Council (1965–1986) and English Heritage (1986 to date). It remains focused on London (now defined as Greater London), although between 1998 and 2005, under a trial programme since discontinued, 34 plaques were erected elsewhere in England. The first such scheme in the world, it has directly or indirectly provided the inspiration and model for many others.

Many other plaque schemes have since been initiated in the United Kingdom. Some are restricted to a specific geographical area, others to a particular theme of historical commemoration. They are administered by a range of bodies including local authorities, civic societies, residents' associations and other organisations such as the Transport Trust, the Royal Society of Chemistry, the Music Hall Guild of Great Britain and America, the Centre for Pagan Studies and the British Comic Society. 

There are also commemorative plaque schemes throughout the world such as those in Paris, Rome, Oslo, Dublin; and in other cities in Australia, Canada, the Philippines, Russia and the United States. These take various forms, and they are more likely to be known as commemorative plaques or historical markers.

English Heritage scheme 

The original blue plaque scheme was established by the Society of Arts in 1867, and since 1986 has been run by English Heritage. It is the oldest such scheme in the world. Since 1984 English Heritage have commissioned Frank Ashworth to make the plaques which have then been inscribed by his wife, Sue, at their home in Cornwall.

English Heritage plans to erect an average of twelve new blue plaques each year in London.

History 
After being conceived by politician William Ewart in 1863, the scheme was initiated in 1866 by Ewart, Henry Cole and the Society of Arts (now the Royal Society of Arts), which erected plaques in a variety of shapes and colours.

The first plaque was unveiled in 1867 to commemorate Lord Byron at his birthplace, 24 Holles Street, Cavendish Square. This house was demolished in 1889. The earliest blue plaque to survive, also put up in 1867, commemorates Napoleon III in King Street, St James's. Byron's plaque was blue, but the colour was changed by the manufacturer Minton, Hollins & Co to chocolate brown to save money. The first woman to be honoured with a plaque was the actor Sarah Siddons in 1876. The plaque, placed on her house in Marylebone, London, was retrieved when the house was demolished in 1905 and is now held in the Victoria and Albert Museum.

In total the Society of Arts put up 35 plaques, fewer than half of which survive today. The Society only erected one plaque within the square-mile of the City of London, that to Samuel Johnson on his house in Gough Square, in 1876. In 1879, it was agreed that the City of London Corporation would be responsible for erecting plaques within the City to recognise its jurisdictional independence. This demarcation has remained ever since.

In 1901, the Society of Arts scheme was taken over by the London County Council (LCC), which gave much thought to the future design of the plaques. It was eventually decided to keep the basic shape and design of the Society's plaques, but to make them uniformly blue, with a laurel wreath and the LCC's title. Though this design was used consistently from 1903 to 1938, some experimentation occurred in the 1920s, and plaques were made in bronze, stone and lead. Shape and colour also varied.

In 1921, the most common (blue) plaque design was revised, as it was discovered that glazed Royal Doulton stoneware was cheaper than the encaustic formerly used. In 1938, a new plaque design was prepared by an unnamed student at the LCC's Central School of Arts and Crafts and was approved by the committee. It omitted the decorative elements of earlier plaque designs, and allowed for lettering to be better spaced and enlarged. A white border was added to the design shortly after, and this has remained the standard ever since. No plaques were erected between 1915 and 1919, or between 1940 and 1947, owing to the two world wars. The LCC formalised the selection criteria for the scheme in 1954.

When the LCC was abolished in 1965, the scheme was taken over by the Greater London Council (GLC). The principles of the scheme changed little, but now applied to the entire, much larger, administrative county of Greater London. The GLC was also keen to broaden the range of people commemorated. The GLC erected 252 plaques, the subjects including Sylvia Pankhurst, Samuel Coleridge-Taylor, and Mary Seacole.

In 1986, the GLC was disbanded and the blue plaques scheme passed to English Heritage. English Heritage erected more than 300 plaques in London.

In January 2013 English Heritage suspended proposals for plaques owing to funding cuts. The National Trust's chairman stated that his organisation might step in to save the scheme. In the event the scheme was relaunched by English Heritage in June 2014 with private funding (including support from a new donors' club, the Blue Plaques Club, and from property developer David Pearl). Two members of the advisory panel, Professor David Edgerton and author and critic Gillian Darley, resigned over this transmutation, concerned that the scheme had been "reduced to a marketing tool for English Heritage".

In April 2015, English Heritage was divided into two parts, Historic England (a statutory body), and the new English Heritage Trust (a charity, which took over the English Heritage operating name and logo). Responsibility for the blue plaque scheme passed to the English Heritage Trust.

Criteria 
To be eligible for an English Heritage blue plaque in London, the famous person concerned must:
 Have been dead for 20 years or have passed the centenary of their birth. Fictional characters are not eligible;
 Be considered eminent by a majority of members of their own profession; have made an outstanding contribution to human welfare or happiness;
 Have lived or worked in that building in London (excluding the City of London and Whitehall) for a significant period, in time or importance, within their life and work; be recognisable to the well-informed passer-by, or deserve national recognition.

In cases of foreigners and overseas visitors, candidates should be of international reputation or significant standing in their own country.

With regards to the location of a plaque:
 Plaques can only be erected on the actual building inhabited by a figure, not the site where the building once stood, or on buildings that have been radically altered;
 Plaques are not placed onto boundary walls, gate piers, educational or ecclesiastic buildings, or the Inns of Court;
 Buildings marked with plaques should be visible from the public highway;
 A single person may not be commemorated with more than one blue plaque in London.

Other schemes have different criteria, which are often less restrictive: in particular, it is common under other schemes for plaques to be erected to mark the sites of demolished buildings.

Selection process 

Almost all the proposals for English Heritage blue plaques are made by members of the public who write or email the organisation before submitting a formal proposal.

English Heritage's in-house historian researches the proposal, and the Blue Plaques Panel advises on which suggestions should be successful. This is composed of 9 people from various disciplines from across the country. The panel is chaired by Professor Ronald Hutton. The actor and broadcaster Stephen Fry was formerly a member of the panel, and wrote the foreword to the book Lived in London: Blue Plaques and the Stories Behind Them (2009).

Roughly a third of proposals are approved in principle, and are placed on a shortlist. Because the scheme is so popular, and because a lot of detailed research has to be carried out, it takes about three years for each case to reach the top of the shortlist. Proposals not taken forward can only be re-proposed once 10 years have elapsed.

Event plaques 
A small minority of GLC and English Heritage plaques have been erected to commemorate events which took place at particular locations rather than the famous people who lived there.

Outside London 
In 1998, English Heritage initiated a trial national plaques scheme, and over the following years erected 34 plaques in Birmingham, Merseyside, Southampton and Portsmouth. The scheme was discontinued in 2005. Although English Heritage no longer erects plaques outside Greater London, it does provide advice and guidance to individuals and organisations interested or involved in doing so.

Other schemes 
The popularity of English Heritage's London blue plaques scheme has meant that a number of comparable schemes have been established elsewhere in the United Kingdom. Many of these schemes also use blue plaques, often manufactured in metal or plastic rather than the ceramic used in London, but some feature plaques of different colours and shapes. In 2012, English Heritage published a register of plaque schemes run by other organisations across England.

The criteria for selection varies greatly. Many schemes treat plaques primarily as memorials and place them on the sites of former buildings, in contrast to the strict English Heritage policy of only installing a plaque on the actual building in which a famous person lived or an event took place.

London 
The Corporation of London continues to run its own plaque scheme for the City of London, where English Heritage does not erect plaques. City of London plaques are blue and ceramic, but are rectangular in shape and carry the City of London coat of arms. Because of the rapidity of change in the built environment within the City, a high proportion of Corporation of London plaques mark the sites of former buildings.

Many of the 32 London boroughs also now have their own schemes, running alongside the English Heritage scheme. Westminster City Council runs a green plaque scheme, each plaque being sponsored by a group with a particular interest in its subject. The London Borough of Southwark started its own blue plaque scheme in 2003, under which the borough awards plaques through popular vote following public nomination: living people may be commemorated. The London Borough of Islington has a similar green heritage plaque scheme, initiated in 2010.

Other plaques may be erected by smaller groups, such as residents' associations. In 2007 the Hampstead Garden Suburb Residents Association erected a blue plaque in memory of Prime Minister Harold Wilson at 12 Southway as part of the suburb's centenary celebrations.

Northern Ireland 
In Northern Ireland the Ulster History Circle is one of a small number of groups administering blue plaques. Established in 1983, it has erected around 140 plaques. Belfast City Council also has a scheme.

England

Thematic schemes 
There also exist several nationwide schemes sponsored by special-interest bodies, which erect plaques at sites or buildings with historical associations within their particular sphere of activity.
 The Transport Trust's Red Wheel scheme erects red plaques on sites of significance in the evolution of transport.
 The Music Hall Guild of Great Britain and America erects blue plaques on sites associated with notable music hall and variety artistes, mainly in the London area.
 The British Comedy Society (previously known as the Dead Comics' Society) erects blue plaques on the former homes of well-known comedians, including those of Sid James and John Le Mesurier.
 The Royal Society of Chemistry's Chemical Landmark Scheme erects hexagonal blue plaques to mark sites where the chemical sciences are considered to have made a significant contribution to health, wealth, or quality of life.
 The Institute of Physics installs circular blue plaques to celebrate physicists' lives or work at various locations in the Great Britain and Ireland. Plaques exist in Edinburgh for Thomas Henderson and Thomas David Anderson, at Glasgow for Alexander Wilson and William Thomson, 1st Baron Kelvin, at Eskdalemuir Observatory for Lewis Fry Richardson, at the birthplace of Charles Thomson Rees Wilson in the Pentland Hills, at Leeds for William Henry Bragg and at Aberdeen for George Paget Thomson. In 2015, Peter Higgs unveiled his own plaque, installed on the building in which he had predicted the Higgs boson.

See also
 List of hoax commemorative plaques
 Purple Plaques commemorative plaques in Wales for women.

References

Further reading

External links 

 Open Plaques open register of historical markers
 Plaques of artists who lived in Tel Aviv in the ultimate street signs, historical sites and house numbers site

 
Plaque, blue
Cultural heritage of the United Kingdom
Historical markers
Cultural history of the United Kingdom